Henry Josey (born September 25, 1991) is a former American football running back. He was most recently a member of the Ottawa Redblacks of the Canadian Football League (CFL). He played college football at Missouri.

Early years
Josey is from Angleton, Texas.  His father, Henry Neal, set a national high school record in the 100-meter dash in 1990.  Josey attended Angleton High School, where he began his football career as a linebacker in 2007.  As a junior, he moved to the running back position and gained 1,267 rushing yards and scored 20 touchdowns.  As a senior in 2009, he gained 1,369 yards rushing and scored 15 touchdowns.

Also a standout track & field athlete, Josey earned a second-place finish in the 100-meters at the 2010 Region 3-4A Meet, recording a career-best time of 10.50 seconds. He also competed as a long jumper, he got a personal-best mark of 6.48 meters at the 2009 Rice Bayou Classic, placing 6th.

College career

2010 season
As a freshman for the 2010 Missouri Tigers football team, Josey gained 112 yards and scored three touchdowns (including a 62-yard touchdown run) in the season opener against McNeese State.  Over the course of the 2010 season, he totaled 437 rushing yards and five touchdowns on 76 carries for an average of 4.8 yards per carry.

2011 season
As a sophomore, Josey became the starting running back for the 2011 Missouri Tigers football team.  In the third week of the season, Josey gained 263 rushing yards and scored three touchdowns on 14 carries against Western Illinois.  He reached the 263 yard mark in the first half and did not play in the second half.  The following week, he rushed for 133 yards and a touchdown on 14 carries against the No. 1 ranked Oklahoma Sooners.

During the 2011 regular season, Josey totaled 1,168 rushing yards on 145 carries for an average of 8.1 yards per carry.  He ranked second in the NCAA Football Bowl Subdivision in yards per carry.  He also ranked 12th in the Football Bowl Subdivision with an average of 116.8 rushing yards per game. His 2011 season ended short due to a severe knee injury.

2012 season
Josey missed spring football practice in 2012.  Although he participated in pre-season practice with the team in August 2012, he did not play in any games during the season.

2013 season
Josey returned to play in all 14 games in 2013, rushing for 1,166 yards on 174 carries with 16 touchdowns. He finished his career with 2,771 yards on 395 carries, a Mizzou-best 7.0 yards per carry (minimum 300 attempts). After the season, he announced that he would forgo his senior season and enter the 2014 NFL Draft.

Professional career

Philadelphia Eagles
Josey signed as an undrafted free agent with the Philadelphia Eagles on May 10, 2014. While Josey had a strong pre-season, he was released by the Eagles on August 29, 2014.

Jacksonville Jaguars
He was signed to the Jacksonville Jaguars practice squad on August 31, 2014.

Minnesota Vikings
On December 24, 2014, Josey signed with the Minnesota Vikings off the Jaguars' practice squad.

Toronto Argonauts

On May 26, 2015, Josey signed with the Toronto Argonauts in the Canadian Football League (CFL). In the 2015 season Josey carried the ball 16 times gaining 30 yards on the ground; he also caught four passes for 15 yards.

Ottawa Redblacks 
Josey signed with the Ottawa Redblacks (CFL) on September 25, 2017. He was released by the club on April 12, 2018.

See also
 List of college football yearly rushing leaders

References

External links
Philadelphia Eagles bio 
Missouri Tigers bio

1991 births
Living people
American football running backs
Canadian football running backs
African-American players of American football
African-American players of Canadian football
Missouri Tigers football players
Players of American football from Texas
People from Angleton, Texas
Philadelphia Eagles players
Jacksonville Jaguars players
Minnesota Vikings players
Toronto Argonauts players
21st-century African-American sportspeople